is a Japanese football player. He plays for Tochigi Uva FC.

Playing career
Chikara Hanada played for Japan Soccer College from 2012 to 2014. He moved to Grulla Morioka in 2015 and to Tochigi Uva FC in 2016.

Club statistics
Updated to 20 February 2018.

References

External links

1993 births
Living people
Association football people from Tochigi Prefecture
Japanese footballers
J3 League players
Japan Football League players
Iwate Grulla Morioka players
Tochigi City FC players
Japan Soccer College players
Vanraure Hachinohe players
Association football goalkeepers